The Scene of the Crime is a studio album by American singer-songwriter Bettye LaVette, released in the United States on September 25, 2007 on the label ANTI-. It is a collaboration with Drive-By Truckers as backing band, Spooner Oldham on piano, and other studio musicians. The album debuted at number one on Billboards Top Blues Albums chart and was nominated for Best Contemporary Blues Album at the 2008 Grammy Awards.

Track listing
"I Still Want to Be Your Baby (Take Me Like I Am)" (Eddie Hinton) – 3:45
Originally recorded by Eddie Hinton
"Choices" (Billy Yates, Mike Curtis) – 3:04
Originally recorded by George Jones
"Jealousy" (Frankie Miller) – 5:36
Originally recorded by Frankie Miller
"You Don't Know Me at All" (Don Henley, John Corey, Stan Lynch) – 3:58
Originally recorded by Don Henley
"Somebody Pick Up My Pieces" (Willie Nelson) – 5:22
Originally recorded by Willie Nelson
"They Call It Love" (W. T. Davidson) – 3:57
Originally recorded by Ray Charles
"The Last Time" (John Hiatt) – 2:58
Originally recorded by John Hiatt
"Talking Old Soldiers" (Elton John, Bernie Taupin) – 4:26
Originally recorded by Elton John
"Before the Money Came (The Battle of Bettye LaVette)" (Bettye LaVette, Patterson Hood) – 4:30
"I Guess We Shouldn't Talk About That Now" (Ed Pettersen, Kim McLean) – 3:46

Personnel

Musicians
Bettye LaVette – vocals
Mike Cooley – guitar
Sum Haque – piano
Kelvin Holly – guitar
David Hood – bass
Patterson Hood – guitar
Brad Morgan – drums
John Neff – guitar, pedal steel guitar
Spooner Oldham – piano, Wurlitzer electric piano
Shonna Tucker – bass

Production
Bettye LaVette – producer
John Agnello – additional engineer
David Barbe – producer, engineer, mixing, additional engineer
Elizabeth Fladung – portrait photography
Gene Grimaldi – mastering
Patterson Hood – producer, liner notes
Andy Kaulkin – executive producer
Kevin Kiley – photography
Bryan Sheffield – photography, cover photo
Benjamin Tanner – engineer

Charts

References

External links
The Scene of the Crime on ANTI-

2007 albums
Bettye LaVette albums
Anti- (record label) albums